This is a list of airports in New Jersey (a U.S. state), grouped by type and sorted by location. It contains all public-use and military airports in the state. Some private-use and former airports may be included where notable, such as airports that were previously public-use, those with commercial enplanements recorded by the FAA or airports assigned an IATA airport code

Airports

See also 
 New Jersey World War II Army Airfields
 Aviation in the New York metropolitan area

References 

 Aviation Safety Network – used to check IATA airport codes
 Great Circle Mapper: Airports in New Jersey – used to check IATA and ICAO airport codes
 Abandoned & Little-Known Airfields: New Jersey – used for information on former airports

Federal Aviation Administration (FAA)
 FAA Airport Data (Form 5010) from National Flight Data Center (NFDC), also available from AirportIQ 5010
 National Plan of Integrated Airport Systems (2017–2021), released September 2016
 Passenger Boarding (Enplanement) Data for CY 2016 (final), released October 2017

New Jersey Department of Transportation (NJDOT)
 Aviation
 Public Use Airports

 
Airports
New Jersey
Airports